Dolichoderus cuspidatus is a species of ant in the genus Dolichoderus. Described by Smith in 1857, the species is endemic to Borneo, Indonesia, Malaysia and Thailand.

References

Dolichoderus
Hymenoptera of Asia
Insects of Borneo
Insects of Indonesia
Insects of Malaysia
Insects of Thailand
Insects described in 1857